"Everything She Wants" is a song by British pop duo Wham!, originally released as a single in 1984 on Epic Records on a double A-side with "Last Christmas". It was written and produced by George Michael, one half of the duo, becoming their third consecutive million-selling number-one hit in the United States.

Origin

Writing 
Like most other Wham! songs from this period, it was written by George Michael. He discussed in the Fall 1985 issue of ASCAP In Action:

Michael elaborated on the song's lyrics and the meaning behind them in Dick Clark's Countdown radio show:

Recording 
"Everything She Wants" was recorded in August 1984 at Marcadet Studios in Paris using a 3M 32-track recorder and was most likely finished off at Sarm West’s Studio 2 in London after most of Make It Big had been finished at Studio Miraval in southeastern France over a period of six weeks. The song was based around a mono 2-bar LinnDrum loop, which wasn’t intended as the "keeper drum part" initially but it was eventually used for the finished record. 
Despite being credited as a Wham! track, it's also a departure in the sense that George Michael recorded the track entirely by himself (with engineer Chris Porter in attendance), as opposed to the typical procedure of using session musicians to realise his ideas (which he did for most of the Make It Big record). According to Porter, “I think this was when George started to realise that if he wanted to, he could do everything himself. He could cut out all these other people and their ideas.” This would pave way for Last Christmas, which would be recorded the same month using the same approach. Plus, all the musicians that had participated in the Marcadet sessions had already flown back to the UK by the time Michael came around to recording it, so perhaps there wasn’t any point in hiring any more session musicians.

Michael confirms: 

He added that both songs were all made on one synthesizer, referring to a Roland Juno-60.

History 
Upon release, "Last Christmas" took the majority of the attention and airplay as it was appropriate in early December as Christmas approached. However, the presence of an equally-billed flip side meant that radio stations had something else to play once "Last Christmas" had lost its topicality.

The presence of the Band Aid project meant that the double A-side peaked at number two in the UK Singles Chart, although in the process it became the biggest-selling record not to get to number one. However, in the USA, the song did reach number one on the Billboard Hot 100, and became the third number-one song in a row from 1984's Make It Big album.

Wham! had two more number-one hits in the UK before splitting at their height in 1986.

Cash Box said that the song is a "probing R&B cut" that is "perfect dance floor material".

Although Michael bemoaned much of Wham!'s material as he began his solo career, "Everything She Wants" remained a song of which he was proud, and he continued to perform it in his shows. Furthermore, Michael remarked in an interview (to promote 25 Live tour) that "Everything She Wants" was his favourite Wham! song.

In 1996, the song was performed at the MTV Unplugged concert.

In 1997, the song was remixed and re-released as "Everything She Wants '97" for the greatest hits album The Best of Wham!: If You Were There....

In September 2011 during the Symphonica Tour, at a concert at SAP Arena, Mannheim, Germany, George Michael said that "Understand" featured on Twenty Five was written as a follow-up to "Everything She Wants" with the man in the song realizing that his woman cared a lot more about love than he ever dreamed of.

"Everything She Wants" was featured on the official soundtrack album to Last Christmas released by Sony Music on CD, 2-disc vinyl, and digital formats on 8 November 2019.

Other versions 
The a cappella group Naturally 7 sampled "Everything She Wants" on their 2011 song "Life Goes On", an arrangement that was personally approved by Michael.

In 2020, Alien Ant Farm recorded a rock remake the song. Its music video, shot during the COVID-19 pandemic, features cameos from artists like Insane Clown Posse, Hyro the Hero, Charlie Benante of Anthrax, CJ Pierce of Drowning Pool, and several others.

Music video 

The official music video for the song was directed by Andy Morahan, and is footage of a live performance in black and white.

Track listing 

 Also released in a limited edition with a 1985 calendar (WQTA 4949)

Note: Track 1 plays 7" remix but is labelled only as "Remix"

Charts

Weekly charts

Year-end charts

Certifications and sales

References

External links 
 

1984 songs
1984 singles
1985 singles
Billboard Hot 100 number-one singles
Cashbox number-one singles
CBS Records singles
Music videos directed by Andy Morahan
Number-one singles in Iceland
RPM Top Singles number-one singles
Songs written by George Michael
Song recordings produced by George Michael
Wham! songs